Daisuke Nakamura may refer to:
 Daisuke Nakamura (actor)
 Daisuke Nakamura (fighter)